The Brinton Museum located on the Quarter Circle A Ranch and formerly known as the Bradford Brinton Memorial Museum, is a museum and historic ranch located  southwest of Big Horn, Wyoming. The ranch was built in 1893 by William Moncreiffe, a Scottish immigrant and successful businessman. In 1923, Bradford Brinton bought the ranch from Moncreiffe and expanded it to its current appearance. Brinton collected art and historical materials, particularly those relating to Native American history; after his death in 1936, his sister Helen converted the ranch to a museum displaying his collections.

Wyoming's rolling Bighorn Mountains envelop The Brinton Museum on the Quarter Circle A Ranch. Its sweeping landscape and surrounding mountain range have been the muse of treasured American artists from Remington to Borein to Gollings, and the setting for rich cultural traditions integral to the American Indian tribes inhabiting this region. Today, it serves as a gleaming example of Wyoming's transformation, and continues to delight and inspire artists and guests from around the world.

At the heart of The Brinton Museum is the art, historic documents, books and furnishings that made up Bradford Brinton's original collection and which showcase the elegant and eclectic tastes of this well-educated Western gentleman. The permanent collection is on display in long-term exhibitions in the new facility and in its original setting in the Brinton Ranch House, and complemented by frequently changing exhibits featuring art of the 19th, 20th and 21st centuries. Each exhibition has been thoughtfully curated to tell a distinctive story of the American West through historical and contemporary perspectives. The Brinton Museum is widely recognized for its careful preservation practices and acquisition of new pieces, and honoring the art and craftsmanship of the West and Bradford Brinton's intent to support both.

The Brinton's world-class staff guides visitors to understand celebrated artists of the past, their works, and how they’ve inspired contemporary artists to explore and expand the art of the American West. Through home and museum tours, hands-on educational programming, artists’ series and a variety of special events that celebrate The Brinton and the riches of the Quarter Circle A Ranch, students of all ages leave The Brinton Museum with a deeper connection to art, American history, and the spectacular environment that surrounds them.

Today 
The Brinton Museum opened its new state-of-the-art Forrest E. Mars, Jr. Building on June 15, 2015. Located on the 620-acre historic Quarter Circle A Ranch in Big Horn, WY, the new 24,000-square-foot $15.8-million, eco-conscious museum houses one of the most significant and extensive 19th and 20th century Western and American Indian Art collections in the U.S. featuring Frederic Remington, Charles Marion Russell, Thomas Moran, Edward Borein, Winold Reiss, and the largest Hans Kleiber collection in the world. It includes four galleries, a museum store and the Brinton Bistro, which offers indoor and outdoor dining with 180-degree views of the Bighorn Mountains. Many generous private donors and foundations helped to make the new Forrest E. Mars, Jr. Building possible.

The new three-story space was designed by the Sheridan, WY Architecture/ Engineering firm of Malone Belton Abel P.C. to reveal and honor the beauty of the area, while aligning with the natural geography of the ranch. Nestled into the hillside, it is anchored by a two-foot thick, 51-foot high, 209-foot long arced structural rammed earth wall, the tallest in North America. Principal Architect Timothy Belton, AIA, explains the design as symbolically integrating the space, honoring both the original family that began the collection and the spiritual nature of its American Indian Art collections. Climate-controlled galleries and a 4,000-square foot high-tech storage facility can now accommodate thousands of pieces of art, allowing the Brinton Museum to better preserve and exhibit current and new works and collections by iconic artists.

Construction of the new spaces and storage facility allowed the Brinton Museum to receive the Gallatin Collection, gifted to the museum by Fr. Peter Powell of the Foundation for the Preservation of American Indian Art and Culture in Chicago. Originally compiled by the Gallatin Family in Big Horn, highlights of the collection have been on view at the Art Institute of Chicago for more than 45 years. The complete collection features more than 100 pieces of American Indian art and artifacts, 60 of which are on permanent display in the Brinton Museum's new John and Adrienne Mars American Indian Gallery.

Bradford Brinton's sister, Helen Brinton, founded the Brinton Museum in 1960, and it was opened to the public as the Bradford Brinton Memorial in June 1961. Her mission was to share Brinton's original collection of art, historic documents, books and furnishings assembled in the early 1900s, which showcase the elegant and eclectic tastes of a well-educated Western gentleman who befriended and supported the top artists of his time. Today, the Brinton Museum showcases its historic and contemporary collections in long-term and changing exhibitions in the original Brinton Ranch House and throughout its new Western, American Indian and contemporary galleries. The Quarter Circle A Ranch also includes expansive gardens and a greenhouse, Little Goose Creek Lodge, and multiple 1900s-era buildings such as the Carriage Barn that houses a historic automobile, J.I. Case truck and various farm implements, and a saddle barn full of horse gear. In the next two years, the Brinton Museum also will convert its original 5,000-square-foot museum space into an education center.

“The Brinton Museum is the only museum in the U.S. that maintains a significant historic and ever-expanding Western and American Indian art collection on a beautifully maintained historic property at the foot of a mountain range,” said Schuster. “The art, as well as the Quarter Circle A Ranch property, are an American treasure.”

The ranch was added to the National Register of Historic Places on August 10, 1976.

References

External links
Brinton Museum website

Ranches on the National Register of Historic Places in Wyoming
Houses completed in 1893
Museums in Sheridan County, Wyoming
Farm museums in Wyoming
Art museums and galleries in Wyoming
National Register of Historic Places in Sheridan County, Wyoming